Victor Lawrence Carroll (30 April 1912 – 18 October 1998) was an Australian rules footballer who played 12 consecutive games with Fitzroy in 1937 in the Victorian Football League (VFL).

Family
The son of Edward Martin Carroll (1883-1958), and Emily Sarah Carroll (1883-1967), née Bisset, Victor Lawrence Carroll was born at Malvern, Victoria on 30 April 1912.

He married Mary Agnes Ison (1918-1980) in 1937.

Football

Melbourne (VFL) 
Carroll and one of his two younger brothers, Norm  i.e., Norman Powlett Carroll (1910-1968)  had previously trained with the Melbourne Football Club in 1931.

Fitzroy (VFL)
Cleared to Fitzroy from Corowa on 26 May 1937, Carroll made his First XVIII debut against Geelong, at the Corio Oval, on 5 June 1937.

Corowa
Carroll was cleared back to the Corowa Football Club in the Ovens and Murray Football League in April, 1938.

Military service
Carroll later served in the Australian Army for six months during World War II.

Notes

References
 
 World War Two Nominal Roll: Private Victor Laurence (sic) Carroll (V372185), Department of Veterans' Affairs.
 B884, V372185: World War Two Service Record: Private Victor Laurence (sic) Carroll (V372185), National Archives of Australia.

External links 
 
 
 Victor Carroll, at Demonwiki.
 Norman Carroll, at Demonwiki.

1912 births
1998 deaths
Australian rules footballers from New South Wales
Corowa Football Club players
Fitzroy Football Club players
Australian rules footballers from Melbourne
Australian Army personnel of World War II
Military personnel from New South Wales
People from Malvern, Victoria